EasyJet plc  (styled as easyJet) is a British multinational low-cost airline group headquartered at London Luton Airport. It operates domestic and international scheduled services on 927 routes in more than 34 countries via its affiliate airlines EasyJet UK, EasyJet Switzerland, and EasyJet Europe. EasyJet plc is listed on the London Stock Exchange and is a constituent of the FTSE 250 Index. EasyGroup Holdings Ltd, the investment vehicle of the airline's founder, Greek-Cypriot businessman Stelios Haji-Ioannou, is the largest shareholder with a 15.27% stake (as of September 2021). It employs circa 13,000 people, based throughout Europe but mainly in the UK.

Since its establishment in 1995, EasyJet has expanded through a combination of acquisitions, and base openings fuelled by consumer demand for low-cost air travel. The group, along with associate companies EasyJet UK, EasyJet Europe and EasyJet Switzerland, operates 308 aircraft. It has 29 bases across Europe, the largest being Gatwick. In 2014, the airline carried more than 65 million passengers, making it the second-largest budget airline in Europe by number of passengers carried, behind Ryanair.

EasyJet was featured in the television series Airline, broadcast on ITV (1998–2007), which followed the airline's operations in London Luton and later at other bases. Its pilot training scheme was the subject of another ITV television series, easyJet: Inside the Cockpit, which premiered in August 2017.

On 30 March 2020, EasyJet temporarily grounded its entire fleet of planes due to the COVID-19 pandemic. They later closed three of their bases.

History

Origins and formation
EasyJet has its roots in the business activity of Greek-Cypriot Stelios Haji-Ioannou, who reportedly gained an interest in the aviation business after being approached as a potential investor in Virgin Atlantic's Greek franchisee. Recognising a vacant niche in the market, Stelios decided to examine the prospects for launching his airline, having secured a commitment of a £5 million loan from his father. While studying various business models in the industry, Stelios took a significant interest in the American operator Southwest Airlines, which had successfully adopted the practice of price elasticity to be competitive with traditionally cheaper buses and attract customers that wouldn't normally have considered air travel. This principle became a cornerstone of EasyJet's operations.

In 1995, EasyJet was established by Stelios, being the first company in what would later become the easyGroup conglomerate. Upon launch, it employed just 70 people; the company is based at London Luton Airport, which was traditionally used only by charter flights. To encourage the company, Luton Airport chose to give EasyJet free use of 15,000 square feet building for its headquarters, which it named easyLand; its management style typified minimal overhead, such as an early implementation of the paperless office concept. EasyJet initially operated a pair of wet leased Boeing 737-200 aircraft, capable of seating 130 passengers. These were flown on two routes: Luton to Glasgow and Edinburgh. Early on, EasyJet operated as a paper airline, the aircraft themselves being flown and maintained under a lease.

Early promotional activity focused on the airline's relatively low pricing compared to incumbent operators. Within its first year, easyJet reportedly carried approximately 40,000 passengers.

In April 1996, the first wholly owned aircraft was delivered to EasyJet, enabling the company's first international route, to Amsterdam, which was operated in direct competition with rival airlines British Airways (BA) and Dutch flag carrier KLM. Competitors responded to the emerging EasyJet in different ways; while BA was largely indifferent, KLM allegedly chose to respond with a predatory pricing strategy that led to an investigation by the European Union over unfair competitive practices. Despite commercial pressure from the emergent no-frills sector, traditional airlines have been unable to directly adopt similar practices to EasyJet due to vigorous protection of existing employee privileges by unions.

Until October 1997, all of EasyJet's aircraft were operated by GB Airways, and subsequently by Monarch Airlines and Air Foyle HeavyLift, as EasyJet had not yet received its Air Operator's Certificate.

Flotation 
On 5 November 2000, EasyJet was floated on the London Stock Exchange. In October 2004, the FL Group, owner of the airlines Icelandair and Sterling Airlines, purchased an 8.4% stake in the airline. Over the course of 2005, FL increased its share in the company periodically to 16.9%, fuelling speculation that it would mount a takeover bid for the UK carrier. However, in April 2006, the threat of takeover receded as FL sold its stake for €325 million, securing a profit of €140 million on its investment.

In March 2013, EasyJet was promoted to the FTSE 100; during the same month, the company launched its 100th route from Gatwick Airport, offering flights directly from London to Moscow. By 2015, the company was flying routes to more than 130 destinations in 31 countries, operated 26 bases centred around Europe, and had a total of 10,000 employees.

Expansion and acquisitions

In March 1998, EasyJet purchased a 40% stake in Swiss charter airline TEA Basle for three million Swiss francs. The airline was renamed EasyJet Switzerland and commenced franchise services on 1 April 1999, having relocated its headquarters to Geneva Airport. Geneva was EasyJet's first new base outside the United Kingdom. In 2002, rival airline Go Fly was purchased for £374 million; the airline inherited three new bases from Go, at Bristol Airport, East Midlands Airport and London Stansted Airport; the acquisition of Go almost doubled the number of Boeing 737-300 aircraft in the EasyJet fleet.

In 2002, the airline opened its base at Gatwick Airport. Between 2003 and 2007, it opened additional bases in Germany, France, Italy, and Spain, establishing a presence in continental Europe. By 2007, EasyJet was claiming to be operating more flights per day than any other European airline.

On 25 October 2007, EasyJet purchased the entire share capital of GB Airways from the Bland Group. This acquisition was valued at £103.5 million, and was used by the airline to expand its operations at Gatwick, and to establish a base at Manchester Airport.

In June 2011, the airline opened its eleventh British base – at London Southend Airport, offering flights to Alicante, Amsterdam, Barcelona, Belfast, Faro, Málaga, Jersey, Palma de Mallorca and Ibiza.

In July 2017, EasyJet announced it would open a new European headquarters in Austria to enable it to operate after Brexit.

On 28 October 2017, EasyJet announced it would lease 25 former Air Berlin A320 aircraft to operate across EasyJet Europe's network, under its European AOC. Several of these aircraft were based at Berlin-Tegel Airport, before its closure. These aircraft have subsequently been transferred to Berlin-Brandenburg Airport. Previously EasyJet had only operated from Berlin-Schönefeld Airport and Berlin-Tegel Airport, where EasyJet had taken over some of Air Berlin's old services.

On 30 March 2020, EasyJet suspended all flights, grounded its entire fleet, and furloughed its crews due to travel restrictions imposed. This came after the company had flown 650 "rescue flights", taking 45,000 people back home. In April 2020, EasyJet secured a £600 million loan from the UK Government with no environmental conditions attached. In June 2020, EasyJet announced their intention to resume flights, flying half of their routes in July 2020 and up to 75 per cent in August 2020, though with reduced frequency.

In April 2020, EasyJet became involved in a dispute with its owner and largest shareholder, Stelios Haji-Ioannou. Haji-Ioannou criticised the airline's decision not to seek to cancel the outstanding Airbus order, claiming it would create an additional £4.5 billion of capital which the airline could not afford to spend. He threatened to call a general meeting to remove a director every three weeks unless subsequent action was taken. A general meeting was held on 22 May, where shareholders ultimately voted over 99% in favour of the EasyJet board and retaining the Airbus contract.

On 19 May 2020, the company revealed that it had been the subject of a cyber-attack resulting in the release of the personal information of 9 million customers.

On 17 August 2020, EasyJet confirmed in a statement they would be closing three bases in the UK. Stansted, Southend, as well as Newcastle from the end of August due to low levels of air travel demand as a result of the COVID-19 pandemic.

On 10 September 2021, the company claimed it had rejected a takeover bid from rival Wizz Air.

On 30 September 2021, Stelios Haji-Ioannou and his family lost control of the company, after failing to take up the rights issue and being diluted: their stake was 15.27% as of 30 September 2021.

Senior leadership 

 Chairman: Stephen Hester (since December 2021)
 Chief Executive: Johan Lundgren (since December 2017)

Former chairmen 

 Sir Stelios Haji-Ioannou (1995–2002)
 Sir Colin Chandler (2003–2009)
 Sir Michael Rake (2010–2013)
 John Barton (2013–2021)

Former chief executives 

 Ray Webster (1996–2005)
 Andy Harrison (2005–2010)
 Carolyn McCall (2010–2017)

Corporate affairs

Business strategy
EasyJet, like Ryanair, uses a business model pioneered by Southwest Airlines. Both airlines have adapted this model for the European market through further cost-cutting measures, such as not selling connecting flights or providing complimentary snacks on board. The key points of this business model are high aircraft utilisation, quick turnaround times, charging for extras (such as priority boarding, holding baggage, and food) and keeping operating costs low. One main difference EasyJet and Ryanair have from Southwest is they both fly a young fleet of aircraft. Southwest has an average fleet age of 11.9 years whereas Ryanair's and EasyJet's average fleet ages are just a little over six years each.

Initially, EasyJet's employment strategy was to maintain control with minimal union involvement. During the 2000s, the airline adopted a different approach, deciding to make accommodations for unions.

Originally, EasyJet did not allocate seats so passengers took any available seats, with the option to pay for "Speedy Boarding", which allowed them to be first onto the aircraft. Since 2012, all passengers are allocated numbered seats before boarding commences, as it was found that this does not slow down boarding times and could earn more revenue than Speedy Boarding. Passengers can pay an additional fee for certain seats such as the front few rows and overwing seats (which have extra legroom).

Financial performance

Since the start of the COVID-19 pandemic until August 2020, EasyJet raised over £2.4 billion in new finance. Out of the sum, £600 million came from the Covid Corporate Financing Facility provided by the UK government and over £400 million was raised from the placement of shares. In November 2020, EasyJet announced that, due to the pandemic and the lockdowns in many countries, it would scale back its reduced flying schedule to no more than 20 per cent of capacity. It also announced its first annual loss during the 25-year history of the company.

Head office

Hangar 89, built in 1974, has  of office space and can house three aircraft the size of an Airbus A319 at one time. When EasyJet received H89, it had a 1970s-style office setup. The airline modernised the building and painted it orange.

Marketing
EasyJet's early marketing slogan was "making flying as affordable as a pair of jeans". It urged travellers to cut out the travel agent. Its original advertising consisted of little more than the airline's telephone booking number painted in bright orange on the side of its aircraft. The specific colour that EasyJet uses closely resembles that of the telecommunications corporation Orange and was a subject of dispute between the two companies in 2004 when easyGroup launched a mobile phone subsidiary, easyMobile.

The Airline TV series created by LWT and filmed between 1999 and 2007 made EasyJet a household name in the United Kingdom. The series, while not always portraying the airline in a positive light, did much to promote it during this time. The airline has used a number of slogans since its establishment, including "The Web's Favourite Airline", "Come on, let's fly" and "To Fly, To Save" (a parody of British Airways' slogan "To Fly, To Serve"). This was then followed by "[....] by easyJet", with "Europe by easyJet" and "business by easyJet" being the most widely used. It currently uses the slogan "This is Generation easyJet".

Environment
In June 2007, EasyJet announced plans for the construction of its airliner, dubbed EcoJet. It was claimed to possess improved fuel efficiency over contemporary airliners. To achieve this, the EcoJet was described as using propfan engines, as well as being constructed with extensive use of carbon fibre composite material. At the time of the announcement, it was stated that the first flight was scheduled to occur sometime during 2015. Speaking at the time, EasyJet chief executive Andy Harrison commented that: "We have not developed a new concept. We have taken ideas from Boeing, Airbus and the engine manufacturers and put them together." Harrison claimed that the EcoJet, combined with other improvements in the industry, would enable a 50% reduction in greenhouse gas emissions within eight years. However, there have been few announcements on the project since then.

In February 2011, the airline painted eight of its aircraft with a lightweight, thin "revolutionary nanotechnology coating" polymer. It works by reducing the build-up of debris and reduces drag across the surface of the aircraft, thus reducing the fuel bill. It was estimated the airline could save 1–2% annually, equating to a £14 million reduction in fuel costs. The coating has already been used on US military aircraft and if successful EasyJet would apply the paint to its whole fleet. In late 2015, EasyJet started making use of artificial intelligence (AI) and big data for the purpose of improving efficiency, cutting costs, and enhancing the customer experience.

On 27 September 2017, EasyJet announced its partnership with an American start-up company Wright Electric with the purpose of developing and introducing a short-haul 120-seat all-electric airline. The propulsion system is said to comprise a series of eight electrically driven ducted fans that are buried in the wings, which are powered by numerous battery packs distributed underneath the cabin floor; it is claimed to possess a range of roughly 335 miles, suitable for about one-fifth of EasyJet's current city routes, and facilitate zero-emission flights, as well as being 50% quieter and 10% less expensive to operate than conventional jet airliners. At the time, EasyJet stated that it intended to introduce electric aircraft into revenue service within 10 years. In October 2018, EasyJet stated that progress was being made on its electric ambitions and that the partnerships planned to test a nine-seater electric plane as early as 2019.

Since November 2019, easyJet has offset the carbon emissions from all of its flights using carbon offsetting projects that meet either the Gold Standard or Verified Carbon Standard (VCS) accreditation. As a result, it is the first major airline in the world to operate net-carbon-zero flights across its entire network. The airline describes this as an "interim" measure whilst the next generation of aircraft propulsion is developed. Consequently, easyJet announced a partnership with Airbus on a joint research project into zero-emission hydrogen aircraft.

Criticism
EasyJet has been criticised in Germany for not observing European Union law on compensation (and assistance to passengers) in cases of denied boarding, delays or cancellations (Regulation 261/2004). When flights are cancelled, passengers are supposed to be reimbursed within one week. In 2006, the airline did not always refund tickets in a timely fashion. Passengers occasionally had to wait longer for reimbursement of their expenses.

EasyJet has campaigned for the UK to replace air passenger duty (APD) with a new tax that would vary depending on distance travelled and aircraft type.

In July 2008, the United Kingdom Advertising Standards Authority (ASA) criticised a press campaign by the airline, over a misleading environmental claim that its aircraft released 22% fewer emissions than rival airlines. The figures used were not based on emissions produced by an EasyJet aircraft or emissions produced by the airline overall as the advertisement implied, and ASA declared that the airline had broken advertising rules. The judgement that followed reprimanded the airline in April 2007 after it made comments that its aircraft created 30% less pollution per passenger than some of its rivals.

In July 2011, the airline tried to refuse the carriage of a boy with muscular dystrophy because he had an electric wheelchair. In separate incidents in 2012, paralympians received similar treatment, and a French court found the airline guilty of three counts of disability discrimination. In January 2017, the company was fined €60,000 by another French court because it had refused to allow a disabled passenger to the board in 2010; the company cited security concerns and internal regulations but said it would not appeal against the ruling.

In September 2013, a passenger who sent a tweet complaining about the airline after his flight was delayed said he was initially told he would not be allowed to board the aircraft because of the posting.

On 27 August 2020, the airline was sued by a woman over discriminatory concerns. The woman had been asked to switch seats twice in a row, to accommodate two ultra-Orthodox Jewish men.

European AOC 

Following the UK's referendum vote to leave the European Union, EasyJet announced a plan to establish an Air Operator Certificate (AOC) in another EU member state. This will secure the flying rights of the 30% of EasyJet's network that remains wholly within and between EU states, excluding the UK. EasyJet expects a one-off cost of around £10 million over two years with up to £5 million incurred in the 2017 financial year. The primary driver of the cost is the re-registering of aircraft in an EU AOC jurisdiction. In July 2017, EasyJet announced that it has applied for, and was subsequently granted by the Ministry of Transport, an Austrian Air Operator Certificate (AOC) and operating permit, thereby establishing EasyJet Europe. The new airline is headquartered in Vienna and will allow EasyJet to continue operating flights across and within European countries after the UK leaves the EU. The first aircraft, an Airbus A320, was re-registered as OE-IVA.

EasyJet announced that the transition would result in no job losses in the UK, as the staff to be employed by EasyJet Europe are already based in the EU27. EasyJet UK staff would continue to be based in Luton. The group will thus comprise three airlines, EasyJet UK, EasyJet Europe, and EasyJet Switzerland, all of which are owned by EasyJet plc, which is itself EU owned and controlled, listed on the London Stock Exchange, and based in the UK. In May 2018, EasyJet confirmed that it was very close to achieving the required majority EU27 share ownership and that the UK government will nevertheless continue to consider it as a UK airline.

Destinations

EasyJet serves 136 destinations (as of February 2019).

Codeshare agreements
In 2013, EasyJet entered a commercial agreement with Transaero to set up a codeshare agreement, whereby Transaero acquired the right to sell a certain number of seats on EasyJet's Moscow (Domodedovo) – London (Gatwick) route. This was the first codeshare agreement for EasyJet; it was terminated when Transaero Airlines ceased to operate in October 2015. Citing diminishing demand on the route, EasyJet ceased all flights to Moscow in March 2016.

EasyJet has a reward miles sharing agreement with Emirates.

Fleet

Current group fleet

EasyJet plc.'s total fleet comprises entirely Airbus A320 family aircraft. , the group operates the following aircraft:

Fleet strategy and aircraft orders
In common with other low-cost carriers, EasyJet has a strategy of operating just one aircraft type. Initially, it used Boeing 737 aircraft exclusively, but in October 2002 it ordered 120 Airbus A319 aircraft, plus 120 options. Since then, all orders have been from the Airbus A320 family, and the Boeings have been phased out. With the acquisition of GB Airways in 2007, easyJet inherited nine Airbus A320 and six Airbus A321 aircraft. This gave the airline some time to evaluate the feasibility of operating these larger aircraft. Based on this evaluation, EasyJet exchanged 25 A319 orders for A320s in July 2008 and later removed the A321 aircraft from the fleet.

On 18 June 2013, the airline announced an intention to acquire – subject to shareholder approval – 35 Airbus A320 aircraft, for delivery between 2015 and 2017, and 100 Airbus A320neo aircraft for delivery between 2017 and 2022. As part of the agreement, the airline will have purchase rights on a further 100 A320neo aircraft. The current generation A320s and fifty of the A320neos will replace current A319 aircraft.

On 15 May 2017, EasyJet announced the conversion of 30 A320neo orders into A321neo aircraft to be used on busier routes. The then-CEO of EasyJet, Carolyn McCall, stated of the change: "bigger planes would help EasyJet increase capacity in slot-constrained airports at peak times, such as Geneva, Amsterdam and London Gatwick". She added that the A321neos would help to cut costs by 9 per cent. The company took delivery of the first A321neo on 18 July 2018 at the Farnborough International Airshow.

On 20 November 2018 EasyJet ordered an additional 17 A320neo, taking their total neo order, including the A321neo, to 147.

On 19 November 2019 EasyJet ordered an additional 12 A320neo, taking the total neo orders, including the A321neo, to 159.

On 20 July 2022, during the Farnborough International Airshow, EasyJet confirmed the placing of an order for 56 A320neo, including an upsizing of 18 A320neo from their original order to the longer A321neo model. EasyJet was reported to have secured a significant reduction on the list price of the aircraft as part of their original 2013 deal with Airbus.

Historical fleet
EasyJet has previously operated the following aircraft:

Services

Booking

Initially, booking was by telephone only; as a means of promoting this, all of the airline's aircraft were painted with the booking telephone number. There is no incentive for travel agents to book flights on the airline because it does not pay commissions, which is an industry-standard practice for low-cost carriers.

In December 1997, one of EasyJet's design and advertising agencies suggested to Stelios Haji-Ioannou that he should consider trialling a website for direct bookings. Haji-Ioannou's reply was: "The Internet is for nerds, it will never make money for my business!" Other executives of the airline saw the potential and approved a website trial involving putting a different telephone reservation number on the website to track success. Once Haji-Ioannou saw the results, he changed his mind and an e-commerce website capable of offering real-time online booking went live in April 1998; this was the first such website for a low-cost carrier in Europe.

In December 2001, the airline switched from a third-party reservation system to an in-house system. Internet bookings were priced cheaper than booking by telephone to reflect the reduced call centre costs; as a further means of encouraging the use of the website, aircraft were repainted with the web address. Within a year, over 50% of bookings were made using the website; by April 2004, the figure had reportedly jumped to 98%.

Cabin and onboard services

EasyJet's aircraft cabins are configured in a single-class, high-density layout.

The airline's main fleet, comprising Airbus A319, A320/A320neo and A321neo aircraft, carry up to 156, 180/186 and 235 passengers respectively, depending on layout. A typical Airbus A319 carries 150 or 156 passengers depending on the layout in a single-class configuration, but as the airline does not serve meals on its shorter flights, it opted for smaller galleys and had a lavatory installed in unused space at the rear of the aircraft. The space saved by having smaller galleys allowed for the installation of 156 seats. Due to this seating arrangement, to satisfy safety requirements the airline's Airbus A319 aircraft have two pairs of overwing exits, instead of the standard one-pair configuration found on most Airbus A319 aircraft.

EasyJet does not provide complimentary meals or drinks on its flights (except for some occasional charter flights operated by the airline). Passengers may purchase items on board from the "Eat Drink Shop" buy on board programme. Onboard sales are an important part of the airline's ancillary revenue; gifts such as fragrances, cosmetics, gadgets as well as duty-free cigarettes, rolling tobacco and a large selection of spirits. The airline's monthly inflight magazine is called The Traveller.

The airline had previously provided in-flight entertainment (IFE) in some aircraft, such as the ex-GB Airways fleet, using drop-down screens on some Airbus aircraft; by 2018, all use of IFE had been discontinued. The airline offers headphones for purchase, along with a travel pillow and eyeshades, subject to stock. During 2017, 'Air Time' was introduced on some EasyJet Switzerland flights, which enables passengers to connect to watch a selection of films and read books through an on-board WiFi network; this service is provided by Rakuten.

Frequent flyer, business travel and loyalty products
Three distinct loyalty products are offered, tailored towards business and frequent flyers. These are Flexi Fare, EasyJet Plus and a new frequent traveller loyalty programme called Flight Club. Flexi Fare is a type of ticket that is usually more expensive than the regular fare and comparable to a business ticket with other airlines. This ticket offers additional flexibility, including unlimited free date changes within a set period, free route changes, complimentary checked baggage (1x20 kg), an increased carry-on baggage allowance, and a £7.50 on-board refreshment voucher. EasyJet Plus is an annual subscription product targeted at frequent flyers, both business and leisure. This service offers free allocated seating (including extra legroom), priority check-in, fast-track security, speedy boarding and extra cabin baggage. The airline's loyalty programme is called Flight Club.

EasyJet Hotels and EasyJet Holidays
On 14 December 2004, EasyJet and Hotelopia, a subsidiary of First Choice Holidays, launched the co-branded EasyJetHotels accommodation booking service. EasyJetHotels offers accommodation products throughout the airline's network. Customers booking flights through the airline's website are provided with quotes for several hotels at their destination. Alternatively, customers can book accommodation separately at the EasyJetHotels website.

On 28 June 2007, the airline expanded its relationship with Hotelopia by launching EasyJetHolidays, which offers Travel Trust Association protected package holidays made up of EasyJet flights and Hotelopia accommodation products.

On 6 November 2010, the airline started a venture with Low Cost Travel Group, to offer flights dynamically packaged with Low Cost Travel Group's accommodation through the EasyJet Holidays website. As of March 2011, EasyJet Holidays has provided holidays and city breaks to all of the airline's routes.

A mid-November 2019 report indicated that the company planned to relaunch the package holiday business, after the bankruptcy of former competitor Thomas Cook."The total European package holidays market is worth around £61bn per year ... we know customers want holidays with various durations and not the traditional seven and 14 nights. The UK alone is a £13bn market and has grown by 6% annually," according to a company spokesperson.

References

Notes

Citations

Bibliography

External links
 
 

 Airlines established in 1995
 Airlines of the United Kingdom
 British brands
 British companies established in 1995
 Companies based in Luton
 Companies listed on the London Stock Exchange
 EasyGroup
 European Low Fares Airline Association
 Airlines for Europe
 Low-cost carriers
1995 establishments in England